"Tell Me You're Mine" is a song written by Ronald L. Fredianelli and Dico Vasin and performed by The Gaylords.  It reached number 2 on the U.S. pop chart and number 3 on Cashbox in 1953.

The song ranked number 17 on Billboard's Year-End top 30 singles of 1953.

Other versions
Russ Morgan and His Orchestra released a version of the song as the B-side to his 1953 single "Have You Heard?"
Vic Damone released a version of the song on his 1958 album, Angela Mia.
Lou Monte released a version of the song on his 1959 album, Italian Houseparty.
Jerry Vale released a version of the song on his 1962 album, I Have But One Heart.
Gaylord and Holiday released a version of the song on their 1975 album, Second Generation.

References

1952 songs
1952 singles
Vic Damone songs
Jerry Vale songs
Mercury Records singles
Songs written by Ronnie Gaylord